Sinful and Sweet (German: Sündig und süß) is a 1929 German silent comedy film directed by Carl Lamac and starring Anny Ondra, Toni Tetzlaff and Paul Rehkopf.

The film's sets were designed by Heinrich Richter.

Cast
 Anny Ondra as Musette - ein Pariser Modell  
 Toni Tetzlaff as Frau Griche  
 Paul Rehkopf as Herr Griche  
 Julius Falkenstein as Kurzsichtier Nachbar Musettes  
 Eugen Rex as Meunier - Bildhauer  
 Hans Junkermann as Mr. de Malcomte - Kunstliebhaber  
 André Roanne as Joe Willings - reicher Mann aus den USA  
 Teddy Bill as Gaston - Willings' Freund  
 Anielka Elter as Helen - Willings' Freundin  
 Adolphe Engers as Albert - Willings' Diener  
 Hermann Picha as Prof. Voronoffsky - Verjüngungsdoktor  
 Artur Hofer as Ein Ausländer  
 Paul Morgan as Ein Ausländer

References

Bibliography
 Bock, Hans-Michael & Bergfelder, Tim. The Concise Cinegraph: Encyclopaedia of German Cinema. Berghahn Books, 2009.

External links

1929 films
Films of the Weimar Republic
German silent feature films
Films directed by Karel Lamač
German black-and-white films
1929 comedy films
German comedy films
Silent comedy films
1920s German films